Pier Angelo Conti-Manzini (30 June 1946 – 28 October 2003) was an Italian rower who competed in the 1968 Summer Olympics and in the 1972 Summer Olympics.

He was born in Gera Lario and died in Sagnino, Como.

In 1968 he was a crew member of the Italian boat which won the bronze medal in the coxless fours event.

Four years later he finished tenth with the Italian boat in the 1972 coxless four competition.

References 
 
 

1946 births
2003 deaths
Italian male rowers
Olympic rowers of Italy
Rowers at the 1968 Summer Olympics
Rowers at the 1972 Summer Olympics
Olympic bronze medalists for Italy
Sportspeople from the Province of Como
Olympic medalists in rowing
Medalists at the 1968 Summer Olympics